The 1993 Big South Conference men's basketball tournament took place March 3–6, 1993, at the North Charleston Coliseum in North Charleston, South Carolina. For the third time in their school history, the Coastal Carolina Chanticleers won the tournament, led by head coach Russ Bergman.

Although Coastal Carolina won the tournament, due to participation of ineligible players, the Chanticleers victories and title were vacated, and no official conference champion for the tournament was declared.

Format
All of the conference's nine members participated in the tournament, hosted at the North Charleston Coliseum. The bottom two finishers played in a first-round game, with the winner playing the first seed. This was the first season for UMBC and Towson State as conference members, and UNC Greensboro was transitioning to the conference as well.

Bracket

* Asterisk indicates overtime game
Source

All-Tournament Team
Tony Dunkin, Coastal Carolina
Mohammed Acha, Coastal Carolina
KeKe Hicks, Coastal Carolina
Eddie Gay, Winthrop
Mark Hailey, Winthrop

References

Tournament
Big South Conference men's basketball tournament
Big South Conference men's basketball tournament
Big South Conference men's basketball tournament